Baptism of Blood is a 2006 Brazilian film directed by Helvécio Ratton, based on Frei Betto's book of the same name. Starring Caio Blat and Daniel de Oliveira as Frei Tito and Betto respectively, it follows the Dominican friars' resistance against Brazilian military dictatorship.

Plot
In 1968, the Dominican friars of São Paulo became part of the resistance against the military dictatorship in Brazil. Under the pseudonyms of "Tito", "Betto", "Oswaldo", "Fernando", and "Ivo", the friars join the Ação Libertadora Nacional, a communist guerrilla movement headed by Carlos Marighella. The friars' superior, Diogo, recommends them to be more careful, and they decide to disperse themselves.

Ivo and Fernando go to Rio de Janeiro but are intercepted and tortured by officers who accuse them for betraying the Church and Brazil. The officers ask about the place where they receive calls from their leader, and eventually they reveal it. After intercepting a conversation, the police headed by Sérgio Paranhos Fleury discover where Marighella will be and kill him. Meanwhile, Betto is captured in Rio Grande do Sul, and is arrested at the penitentiary Tiradentes in São Paulo along with the other friars.

The friars are later judged and sentenced to four years of imprisonment. Tito is the only who is released in exchange for the West German ambassador in Brazil, Ehrenfried von Holleben, being exiled in France. He is psychologically shaken by the fact that he was tortured, and also because his attempt of suicide during the torture sessions was labeled as a coward act by Fleury. In 1974, he commits suicide in Éveux.

Cast
Caio Blat as Frei Tito
Daniel de Oliveira as Frei Betto
Cássio Gabus Mendes as Sérgio Paranhos Fleury
Ângelo Antônio as Frei Oswaldo
Léo Quintão as Frei Fernando
Odilon Esteves as Frei Ivo
Marku Ribas as Carlos Marighella
Marcélia Cartaxo as Nildes
Murilo Grossi as Raul Careca
Jorge Emil as Frei Diogo

Production
Most of scenes of Baptism of Blood were shot in Belo Horizonte, Minas Gerais that simulated São Paulo. The friars' imprisonment was filmed in Rio de Janeiro, while Tito's exile was shot in France. Differently from other films about the period, the director wanted the torture scenes to be not be merely illustrative. The scenes were reimagined, and Ratton said "or [I would] do something shocking, as is the story, or [I] would not do the film." The friars Betto, Fernando, and Ivo did a lecture about the 1960s Brazil and student activism to the cast.

Reception
It was first screened at the 39th Festival de Brasília, where it won the Best Director and Best Cinematography awards.

References

External links

2006 films
2006 drama films
Brazilian drama films
Films about Brazilian military dictatorship
Films about Catholicism
Films about suicide
Films based on Brazilian novels
Films directed by Helvécio Ratton
Films set in 1968
Films set in 1974
Films shot in France
Films shot in Minas Gerais
Films shot in Rio de Janeiro (city)
2000s Portuguese-language films